Bortolo is a given name. Notable people with the name include:

 Bortolo Belotti (1877–1944), Italian politician
 Bortolo d'Alvise, 16th-century Italian scientific instrument maker
 Bortolo Mutti (born 1954), Italian footballer and manager

Italian given names

Italian masculine given names